Henry Sampson (also Samson, 13 March 1813 – 29 March 1885) was an English cricketer. He played first-class cricket for Sheffield Cricket Club between 1839 and 1860.

References

External links

 

1813 births
1885 deaths
English cricketers
English cricketers of 1826 to 1863
Cricketers from Sheffield
North v South cricketers
Sheffield Cricket Club cricketers
All-England Eleven cricketers
Non-international England cricketers